Most Kwai Chung Limited is a magazine and online media company based in Hong Kong. The company is well-known for owning and running popular satirical magazine 100Most and online media platform TVMost.

Background 
The company and the "Most" brand is founded by Roy Tsui, when he launched 100Most in 2013. The Chinese name of the brand, “Most” and “Mou Gei” is a parody of Hong Kong television station TVB and its Cantonese name “Mou Sin”.

The naming of the company trading name with the term "Kwai Chung", which is a district in Hong Kong, is because their headquarters is located in the Kwai Chung district, and that no other listed companies has added a New Territories area name into their trading name.

History 
In 2013, 100Most was launched as a satirical weekly magazine in Hong Kong.

In 2015, the company launched its new video platform TVMost, which upload numbers of sarcastic videos to Hong Kong citizens, sometimes even imitating TVB’s shows.

On 26 July 2017, Most Kwai Chung submitted their application for listing in the Hong Kong Stock Exchange, but was rejected in January 2018. On 29 January 2018, the company resubmitted their application and it was successfully listed.

In March 2018, the company announced its initial public offering (IPO) plans. It also becomes a listed trading company in Hong Kong with the ticker . The first day of its IPO records retail offer oversubscribed 6,288 times, breaking Hong Kong's IPO record which was formerly held by the 2014 offering of Magnum Entertainment (now AUX International Holdings) with the record of being oversubscribed 3,558 times.

Products and subsidiaries 
Most Kwai Chung is currently the parent company of the following brands and companies: 
 Blackpaper 
 100Most
 TVMost
 Whitepaper Publishing
 French Rotational Production Limited 
 Number Eighteen Limited (formerly known as Most Records Limited)
 General manager Management Limited

References

External links 
 Official website

 
Mass media companies established in 2017
2017 establishments in Hong Kong
Companies listed on the Hong Kong Stock Exchange
Mass media companies of Hong Kong